Lough Lene Gaels (Irish: Gaeil Loch Léinn) is a Gaelic Athletic Association club, based in Collinstown, County Westmeath, Ireland.

Club history
Lough Lene Gaels was founded as a hurling club late in 1969 as a result of an amalgamation between the Collinstown, Fore, Glenidan and Rickardstown hurling clubs.

Their played first match in the Westmeath Senior Hurling Championship resulted in a 5-17 to 5-1 win over Delvin, July 1970.
First victorious honour occurred in early 1972 resulting from a postponed 1971 Junior hurling league final. Raharney were defeated 4-10 to 2-3 on that final. First championship honour came in 1973 when the Junior title was won by defeating Castletown-Geoghegan 7-3 to 2-3.

The awaited breakthrough at senior level arrived 1975 with vanquishing Raharney in the final. The senior title was retained in 1976 before another first was achieved in 1977 when the club won its first ever championship at underage level, namely in the U-14 grade.

Throughout the 1980s Lough Lene Gaels picked up championships titles on a regular basis in the U-21, minor, U-16 & U-14 grades. But a third senior title eluded the club during the 1980s.

The 1990s started well for the club with U-21 and U-16 titles being won followed by 3-in a row sequence of championship successes in the minor grade. 1996 was a glorious year for Lough Lene Gaels as the club won their first ever U-12 championship namely in the "A" grade. On Sunday October 13, 1996 the wait of a generation finally came to an end for Lough Lene Gaels as they won their third SHC title, defeating Castletown-Geoghegan 2-7 to 0-9 in the final at Cusack Park Mullingar. Incidentally the club won the MHC final the same day making it a very special day for the club. In the time that has since passed Lough Lene Gaels have won further titles in the senior, U-21, minor, U-16 and U-12 grades. Lough Lene Gaels won the last SH championship of the 20th century, defeating Castlepollard 1-13 to 1-11 in an exciting final at Cusack Park on Sunday October 24, 1999. The last U-21 championship of the 20th century was also won by the Gaels on December 5, 1999 at Cusack Park. Oliver Plunketts were defeated by 3-5 to 0-8 in that particular final. Overall the close to mid-term future looks encouraging for the Gaels as the first steps are taken in the 21st century.

Another chapter in the history of the club was completed on Sunday September 17, 2000 with the winning of the Westmeath Senior Hurling Championship for the third year in succession. In the final Lough Lene Gaels defeated their neighbours and great arch rivals Castlepollard on a 3-8 to 0-14 scoreline at Cusack Park.

The Club won the senior championship again in 2002 defeating Castletown Geoghegan in a finish which saw them score two goals in injury time. Castletown had goaled in the last minute of normal time to take a one-point lead and looked set for victory.

Lough Lene reached the Westmeath final in 2007.

Honours
 '''Westmeath Senior Hurling Championships: (7)
 1975, 1976, 1996, 1998, 1999, 2000, 2002

References

External links
 Geocities.com/loughlenegaels

Gaelic games clubs in County Westmeath
Hurling clubs in County Westmeath